Kemar Hyman (born 11 October 1989) is a Caymanian sprinter of Jamaican descent. He graduated from Florida State University with an Economic Degree. Whilst competing for Florida State University he became the 2012 ACC indoor and outdoor champion and placed third at the 2012 indoor NCAA championships. Hyman is the national record holder in the 100 and 200 metres. Kemar holds the 60m record with Olympian Kareem Streete-Thompson in 6.56 seconds

Hyman first represented the Cayman Islands at the 2009 World Championships in Athletics in the 100 metres he also became an Olympian at the 2012 London Olympics.

He is a native of George Town, Cayman Islands.

Personal bests

Outdoor
100 m: 9.95 s (wind: +1.8 m/s) –  Madrid, 7 Jul 2012
200 m: 20.73 s (wind: +0.8 m/s) –  Athens, Georgia, 9 April 2016

Indoor
60 m: 6.56 s –  Birmingham, Alabama, 21 January 2012
200 m: 21.42 s –  Blacksburg, Virginia, 22 January 2011

International competitions

1: Disqualified in the semifinal.
2: Did not show in the semifinal.
3: Disqualified in the final.

References

External links

Florida State Seminoles bio

Tilastopaja biography

1989 births
Living people
Caymanian male sprinters
Florida State Seminoles men's track and field athletes
Athletes (track and field) at the 2012 Summer Olympics
Athletes (track and field) at the 2016 Summer Olympics
Athletes (track and field) at the 2020 Summer Olympics
Olympic athletes of the Cayman Islands
Caymanian people of Jamaican descent
British sportspeople of Jamaican descent
Athletes (track and field) at the 2014 Commonwealth Games
Athletes (track and field) at the 2018 Commonwealth Games
Commonwealth Games competitors for the Cayman Islands
World Athletics Championships athletes for the Cayman Islands
Athletes (track and field) at the 2015 Pan American Games
Athletes (track and field) at the 2019 Pan American Games
Pan American Games competitors for the Cayman Islands
Athletes (track and field) at the 2022 Commonwealth Games